William Burnaby was a British naval officer.

William Burnaby may also refer to:

Sir William Chaloner Burnaby, 2nd Baronet (1746–1794) of the Burnaby baronets
Sir William Crisp Hood Burnaby, 3rd Baronet (c. 1788–1853) of the Burnaby baronets
Sir William Edward Burnaby, 4th Baronet (1824–1881) of the Burnaby baronets
William Burnaby (writer) (1673–1706), playwright and translator of the Satyricon

See also
Burnaby (surname)